Numerous individuals have died while using a toilet facility or in the process of defecation or urination. This includes confirmed or suspected historical figures as well as more recent notable cases.

Pre-20th century

20th century

21st century

Deaths in fiction 
 Donald Gennaro (played by Martin Ferrero) is eaten by a Tyrannosaurus rex while sitting on the toilet of a destroyed restroom cabin in the 1993 movie Jurassic Park.
 A Song of Ice and Fire / Game of Thrones: in the book A Storm of Swords (2000) from the series written by George R. R. Martin, Tywin Lannister is killed while using the toilet.
 The Sopranos: one capo for Tony Soprano's crime family, Gigi Cestone, died on the toilet, likely due to stress caused by the new leadership role.
 Rick McCarthy (played by Eric Keenleyside) from Stephen King's Dreamcatcher (2003) dies from expelling an alien while on the toilet.

 Unforgiven: The Schofield Kid (Jaimz Woolvett) assassinates the character Quick Mike (David Mucci) in an outhouse.

 Pulp Fiction: in the film, one of the protagonists Vincent Vega is shot by Butch Coolidge while exiting a bathroom by use of machine gun.

 South Park: in the 2012 episode "Reverse Cowgirl", Clyde's mom falls into the toilet and suffers disembowelment.
Saturday Night Live: produced several fictional advertisements for comedic value for a device called a "Toilet Death Ejector", in which a toilet would "eject" a person off of a toilet if they died on it so they would not be found dead on the toilet.
A panicked passenger (played by Leanne Adachi) locks herself in a restroom and gets pulled down the toilet by the Octalus in the 1998 movie Deep Rising.
 Edward Spratt, a fictional English artist in Return of the Obra Dinn, was strangled by the Kraken as he was using the ship's head at the bow.
 Amir Asif, the main antagonist of the 2020 action movie Extraction, is shot after entering the toilet.

See also 
 List of unusual deaths
 Toilet-related injuries and deaths

References 

Death
Toilet
Toilet deaths